Julian Hanses (born 31 August 1997 in Hilden) is a racing driver from Germany. He currently competes in the Porsche Carrera Cup Germany.

Racing record

Career summary

*Season still in progress.

Complete Toyota Racing Series results 
(key) (Races in bold indicate pole position) (Races in italics indicate fastest lap)

Complete ADAC Formula 4 Championship results
(key) (Races in bold indicate pole position) (Races in italics indicate fastest lap)

Complete FIA Formula 3 European Championship results 
(key) (Races in bold indicate pole position) (Races in italics indicate fastest lap)

Complete Euroformula Open Championship results 
(key) (Races in bold indicate pole position) (Races in italics indicate fastest lap)

Complete ADAC GT4 Germany results
(key) (Races in bold indicate pole position) (Races in italics indicate fastest lap)

References 

German racing drivers
1997 births
Living people
ADAC Formula 4 drivers

Toyota Racing Series drivers
Euroformula Open Championship drivers
FIA Formula 3 European Championship drivers
Porsche Supercup drivers
US Racing drivers
Ma-con Motorsport drivers
Carlin racing drivers
Motopark Academy drivers
Walter Lechner Racing drivers
24H Series drivers
Porsche Carrera Cup Germany drivers